The Russian occupation of Crimea is an ongoing military occupation within Ukraine by the Russian Federation, which began on 20 February 2014 when the military-political, administrative, economic and social order of Russia was spread to the Autonomous Republic of Crimea and Sevastopol. The occupation of Crimea and Sevastopol was the beginning of the Russo-Ukrainian War.

Currently, the recognition of the annexation of Crimea by the Russian Federation is one of the fundamental conditions put forward by Russia to end the Russian invasion of Ukraine. In turn, Ukraine stated that it was ready to liberate the Autonomous Republic of Crimea and Sevastopol by military means. 

On 19 January 2023, Ukraine ascertained that its goal was to de-occupy all territories temporarily seized by Russia, including Crimea, and called on the Western world to provide heavy weapons for this.

Occupation 

On the night of 26–27 February, Russian special forces seized and blocked the Supreme Soviet of Crimea and the Council of Ministers of Crimea. Representatives of the so-called Crimean militia, with the support of military personnel of the Armed Forces of the Russian Federation, seized other administrative buildings, airports in Simferopol and Sevastopol, communications facilities, the mass media, etc. autonomy of Crimea 25 May 2014 – on the day of the presidential elections in Ukraine. At the same time, the presence of a quorum is doubtful, since the media were not allowed to attend the meeting. The Russian saboteur Igor Girkin, on the air of one of the Russian TV programs, admitted that the deputies of the Verkhovna Rada of the Autonomous Republic of Crimea to vote for the decision on the separation of Crimea from Ukraine were forcibly driven away by the so-called "militia", and he personally was one of the commanders of this "militia". Soon, the date of the referendum was changed twice: first moved to 30 March, and then to 16 March. The wording of the question was also changed – instead of expanding autonomy, it was about joining Russia. In fact, both "alternative" questions were formulated in such a way that they excluded Crimea's belonging to Ukraine. At the same time, according to Ukrainian legislation, since Ukraine is a unitary state, the issue of separating the region can only be resolved at a national referendum. Given this, even before the referendum was held, the leaders of Australia, Canada, the European Union, the United Kingdom, the United States and many others considered it illegal, and its results invalid.

On 27 February, unmarked forces with local militias took over the Autonomous Republic of Crimea and Sevastopol, with Russian special forces seizing the building of the Supreme Council of Crimea and the building of the Council of Ministers in Simferopol. Russian flags were raised over these buildings and barricades were erected outside them. Pro-Russian forces also occupied several localities in Kherson Oblast on the Arabat Spit, which is geographically a part of Crimea.

Whilst the "little green men" were occupying the Crimean parliament building, the parliament held an emergency session. It voted to terminate the Crimean government, and replace Prime Minister Anatolii Mohyliov with Sergey Aksyonov. Aksyonov belonged to the Russian Unity party, which received 4% of the vote in the last election. According to the Constitution of Ukraine, the Prime Minister of Crimea is appointed by the Supreme Council of Crimea in consultation with the President of Ukraine. Both Aksyonov and speaker Vladimir Konstantinov stated that they viewed Viktor Yanukovych as the de jure president of Ukraine, through whom they were able to ask Russia for assistance.

The parliament also voted to hold a referendum on greater autonomy set for 25 May. The troops had cut all of the building's communications, and took MPs' phones as they entered. No independent journalists were allowed inside the building while the votes were taking place. Some MPs said they were being threatened and that votes were cast for them and other MPs, even though they were not in the chamber. Interfax-Ukraine reported "it is impossible to find out whether all the 64 members of the 100-member legislature who were registered as present at when the two decisions were voted on or whether someone else used the plastic voting cards of some of them" because due to the armed occupation of parliament it was unclear how many MPs were present.

The head of parliament's information and analysis department, Olha Sulnikova, had phoned from inside the parliamentary building to journalists and had told them 61 of the registered 64 deputies had voted for the referendum resolution and 55 for the resolution to dismiss the government. Donetsk People's Republic separatist Igor Girkin said in January 2015 that Crimean members of parliament were held at gunpoint, and were forced to support the annexation. These actions were immediately declared illegal by the Ukrainian interim government.

On the same day, more troops in unmarked uniforms, assisted this time by what appeared to be local Berkut riot police (as well as Russian troops from the 31st Separate Airborne Assault Brigade dressed in Berkut uniforms), established security checkpoints on the Isthmus of Perekop and the Chonhar Peninsula, which separate Crimea from the Ukrainian mainland. Within hours, Ukraine had been cut off from Crimea.  Shortly afterwards, Ukrainian TV channels became unavailable for Crimean viewers, and some of them were replaced with Russian stations.

On 1 March 2014, Aksyonov said that he would exercise control of all Ukrainian military and security installations on the peninsula. He also asked Putin for "assistance in ensuring peace and tranquillity" in Crimea. Putin promptly received authorisation from the Federation Council of Russia for a Russian military intervention in Ukraine until the "political-social situation in the country is normalized". Putin's swift manoeuvre prompted protests of some Russian intelligentsia and demonstrations in Moscow against a Russian military campaign in Crimea. By 2 March, Russian troops moving from the country's naval base in Sevastopol and reinforced by troops, armour, and helicopters from mainland Russia exercised complete control over the Crimean Peninsula. Russian troops operated in Crimea without insignia. On 3 March they blockaded Southern Naval Base.

On 4 March, Ukrainian General Staff said there were units of the 18th Motor Rifle Brigade, 31st Air Assault Brigade and 22nd Spetsnaz Brigade deployed and operating in Crimea, instead of Russian Black Sea Fleet personnel, which violated international agreements signed by Ukraine and Russia. At a press conference on the same day, Russian president Vladimir Putin said that Russia had no plans to annex Crimea. He also said that it had no plans to invade Ukraine, but that it might intervene if Russians in Ukraine were threatened. This was part of a pattern of public denials of the ongoing Russian military operation.

Numerous media reports and statements by the Ukrainian and foreign governments noted the identity of the unmarked troops as Russian soldiers, but Russian officials concealed the identity of their forces, claiming they were local "self-defence" units over whom they had no authority. As late as 17 April, Russian foreign minister Sergey Lavrov said that there were no "excessive Russian troops" in Ukraine. At the same press conference, Putin said of the peninsula that "only citizens themselves, in conditions of free expression of will and their security can determine their future". Putin later acknowledged that he had ordered "work to bring Crimea back into Russia" as early as February. He also acknowledged that in early March there were "secret opinion polls" held in Crimea, which, according to him, reported overwhelming popular support for Crimea's incorporation into Russia.

Russia eventually admitted its troops' presence. Defence Minister Sergey Shoygu said the country's military actions in Crimea were undertaken by forces of the Black Sea Fleet and were justified by "threat to lives of Crimean civilians" and danger of "takeover of Russian military infrastructure by extremists". Ukraine complained that by increasing its troop presence in Crimea, Russia violated the agreement under which it headquartered its Black Sea Fleet in Sevastopol and violated the country's sovereignty. The United States and United Kingdom accused Russia of breaking the terms of the Budapest Memorandum on Security Assurances, by which Russia, the US, and the UK had reaffirmed their obligation to refrain from the threat or use of force against the territorial integrity or political independence of Ukraine. The Russian government said the Budapest Memorandum did not apply due to "circumstances resulting from the action of internal political or socio-economic factors". In March 2015, retired Russian Admiral  stated that according to his information the Russian troop deployment in Crimea included six helicopter landings and three landings of an IL-76 with 500 people.

Annexation 

On 16 March 2014, an internationally unrecognised referendum on the status of Crimea was held by Russia, where, according to official Russian data, 96.77% of the inhabitants of the (Autonomous) Republic of Crimea and the city of Sevastopol voted for the reunification of the respective territories with the Russian Federation. On 17 March, the Verkhovna Rada of the Autonomous Republic of Crimea proclaimed the independence of the Republic of Crimea, and on 18 March, in the Georgievsky Hall of the Kremlin, President of Russia Vladimir Putin, together with the self-proclaimed Chairman of the Council of Ministers of the Autonomous Republic of Crimea Sergey Aksyonov, the Speaker of the Verkhovna Rada of the Autonomous Republic of Crimea Vladimir Konstantinov and the self-proclaimed life of Sevastopol Aleksei Chalyi, signed the Treaty on the Adoption of the Republic Crimea to Russia. On 21 March, the Federation Council adopted a law on the ratification of the Treaty of 18 March and a law on the formation of new subjects of the federation — the Republic of Crimea and the federal city of Sevastopol, securing the annexation of these regions by Russia.

On 27 March 2014, the United Nations General Assembly supported the territorial integrity of Ukraine, recognizing Autonomous Republic of Crimea and Sevastopol as its integral parts. 100 UN member states out of 194 voted for the relevant resolution. Only 11 countries voted against (Armenia, Belarus, Bolivia, Cuba, Nicaragua, North Korea, Russia, Sudan, Syria, Venezuela and Zimbabwe), 58 abstained. The forced annexation of Crimea is not recognized by Ukraine, is not recognized by the UN General Assembly, PACE, OSCE PA, and also contradicts the decision of the Venice Commission, while the Russian authorities interpret it as "the return of Crimea to Russia." According to the Law of Ukraine "On Ensuring the Rights and Freedoms of Citizens and the Legal Regime in the Temporarily Occupied Territory of Ukraine", the territory of the Crimean Peninsula is considered temporarily occupied territory as a result of Russian occupation.

Kerch Strait incident 

On 25 November 2018, ships of the Ukrainian Navy, consisting of two small armored artillery boats "Berdyansk" and "Nikopol" and a raid tug "Yany Kapu" carried out a planned transition from the port of Odesa on the Black Sea to the port of Mariupol on the Sea of Azov. The Ukrainian side informed in advance about the route in accordance with international standards to ensure the safety of navigation. In the area of ​​the Kerch Strait, they were stopped by a Russian tanker, which blocked the passage under the Crimean Bridge built by the occupying authorities. Contrary to the UN Convention on the Law of the Sea and the Treaty between Ukraine and the Russian Federation on Cooperation in the Use of the Sea of Azov and the Kerch Strait, the border ships of the Russian Federation (patrol border boats of the Sobol type, the Don PSKR, the Mongoose type boats, the Suzdalets MPK) committed aggressive actions against the ships of the Navy of the Armed Forces of Ukraine. The border ship "Don" rammed a Ukrainian raid tug, as a result of which the ship's main engine, plating and railing were damaged, and a life raft was lost. Dispatching service refused to ensure the right of freedom of navigation, guaranteed by international agreements. All three Ukrainian ships were captured by the Russians. 24 sailors were captured, 6 of whom were wounded. In Ukraine, on the same day, an urgent meeting of the National Security and Defense Council was convened to discuss the introduction of martial law. The next day, 26 November, they approved the decision to introduce martial law for 30 days.

Situation of ethnic Ukrainians under occupation 

In the fall of 2014, the Russian authorities conducted a population census in the occupied Crimea, according to which there were 344.5 thousand Ukrainians on the peninsula (15.7%), and the native language was Ukrainian only 3.3% of the Crimean population is native. According to sociologist Iryna Bekeshkina, this reduction in the number of Ukrainians was due to the change in identification of part of the Ukrainian population from Ukrainians to Russians. After the occupation, many ethnic Ukrainians and Crimean Tatars began to leave Crimea for mainland Ukraine. As of 15 August 2019, 40,733 displaced people from the occupied peninsula were officially registered on the mainland of Ukraine. In parallel with this, as the activists of the Crimean Tatar movement drew attention in 2018, several hundreds of thousands of Russians moved to Crimea with the assistance of the Russian authorities during the 4 years of occupation. All this creates grounds for further fundamental changes in the ethnic structure of the peninsula.

After the occupation of Crimea, Ukrainians became one of the ethnic communities of the peninsula most discriminated against by the occupying Russian authorities. The occupying power persecutes Ukrainian public figures, carries out anti-Ukrainian propaganda, makes xenophobic and chauvinist statements, persecutes Ukrainian religious communities, bans the activities of Ukrainian public and political organizations, restricts the use of the Ukrainian language and Ukrainian national symbols. Thus, as early as the first half of 2014, Ukrainian-language signs were replaced with Russian ones, in April 2014, the monument to Petro Sahaydachny and a commemorative sign in honor of the 10th anniversary of the Naval Forces of Ukraine were dismantled in Sevastopol, in August 2014, it was announced that 250 Ukrainian language and literature teachers would be retrained in Russian, in September 2014, the Faculty of Ukrainian Language was liquidated at the Tavri University (a department of Ukrainian philology was created instead), in November 2014, the Crimean Academic Ukrainian Musical Theater was renamed the State Academic Musical Theater of the Republic of Crimea, and the only Ukrainian school-gymnasium in Simferopol was transferred to the Russian language of instruction and renamed to Simferopol Academic Gymnasium, in December 2014, the Ukrainian children's theater studio "Svitanok" closed due to pressure, in March 2016, the Lesia Ukrainka Museum in Yalta was closed for renovation, in the same month, the Russian FSB searched the premises of the Ukrainian society "Prosvita" in Sevastopol, where they seized more than 250 "extremist materials". The power structures of the occupation authorities detained a number of Ukrainian figures, in particular, Andriy Shchekun, Anatoliy Kovalskyi and others, some of the detainees were tortured. The Russian military seized most of the churches of the Orthodox Church of Ukraine —as of October 2018, 38 out of 46 Ukrainian parishes in Crimea stopped working. As of June 2019, only one OCU church remained in operation, but it was also looted by a court decision under the guise of repairs. According to Archbishop of Simferopol and Crimea Klyment, these hostile actions of the Russian occupying power towards the Ukrainian Church are aimed at the complete destruction of Ukrainian identity and Ukrainians as a separate nation in Crimea.

In May 2015, the Ukrainian Cultural Center was established in Crimea, whose participants aimed to preserve Ukrainian culture and language on the peninsula. Members of the center were repeatedly detained by Russian law enforcement agencies for conducting events to celebrate Ukrainian commemorative dates, some of the participants were searched at home, several were held administratively liable by a Russian court, and they were persecuted for their views at the everyday level. In August 2017, the center started publishing the newspaper "Krymsky Teren" in Ukrainian and Russian.

In 2015, after the persecution of members of the UCC, the organization "Ukrainian Community of Crimea" was created, headed by Oleg Usyk, a member of "United Russia", but it later ceased to exist. In 2018, a new legal public organization "Ukrainian Community of Crimea" was founded in Crimea, headed by Anastasia Hrydchyna, a member of the Young Guard of United Russia. This organization expresses support for the actions of the Russian authorities, denies the persecution of Ukrainians on the peninsula, participates in official events of the local occupation authorities, holds several congresses of the Ukrainian diaspora in Crimea, and created the Ukrainian-language website "Pereyaslavska rada 2.0". According to historian Andrii Ivanets and journalists of the Krim.Realii project, in fact this organization does not care about the problems of Ukrainians in Crimea and was created as a means of information warfare.

According to the Constitution of the Republic of Crimea adopted in April 2014, Ukrainian became one of the official languages ​​of this subject (along with Russian and Crimean Tatar). Despite this, the sphere of use of the Ukrainian language is constantly shrinking.  After the occupation of 2014, the study of the Ukrainian language on the peninsula was made optional, and its use in official records was stopped altogether. The number of students with Ukrainian language of instruction continues to decrease.  According to official Russian statistics, 12,892 students studied Ukrainian in the 2016/2017 academic year, and 6,400 students in the 2017/2018 academic year. At the same time, according to Ukrainian and international observers, the real number of students with the Ukrainian language of instruction is much lower than officially declared.  According to Crimean human rights group, during the occupation, the number of students studying Ukrainian decreased 31 times —from 13,589 students in 2013 to 371 students in 2016. In April 2017, following Ukraine's appeal, the International Court of Justice UN in The Hague considered the case of Russia's violation of the International Convention on the Elimination of All Forms of Racial Discrimination and adopted a decision according to which Russia should provide opportunities for teaching in the Ukrainian language on the peninsula. According to the UN, in the 2017/2018 school year, there were 318 students in Crimea who studied in Ukrainian. Before the occupation, there were 7 Ukrainian schools in Crimea, but by 2018 all of them were translated into Russian. According to official data of the Russian Ministry of Education of the Crimea, in the 2018/2019 school year in the Crimea, out of 200,700 children, only 249 (0.2%) studied in the Ukrainian language, there was one Ukrainian-language school and 5 schools with 8 classes with the Ukrainian language of instruction. According to the report of the Crimean human rights group in 2019, not a single school remained in Crimea with the Ukrainian language of instruction, and there were even fewer Ukrainian-language classes than officially claimed.

Some activists (in particular, the Crimean Tatars, who have a smaller but more organized community than Ukrainians) note that, despite the large statistical number, the majority of ethnic Ukrainians in Crimea rarely have pro-Ukrainian political views. At the same time, a number of Crimean Ukrainians do not agree with this opinion.

2022 Russian invasion of Ukraine 

Shortly before the start of negotiations, Vladimir Putin's press secretary Dmitry Peskov, in an interview with Reuters, outlined the main requirements for Ukraine, one of which was the recognition of Crimea as Russian. President of Ukraine Volodymyr Zelenskyy said on the air of the ABC TV channel that he was ready to discuss the issues of Crimea and Donbas, but as part of Ukraine.

On 29 March 2022, the head of the Ukrainian delegation, Mykhailo Podoliak, proposed to negotiate the status of Crimea and Sevastopol for 15 years. At the same time, both Moscow and Kyiv should refrain from resolving this issue by military means throughout this period. Vladimir Medinsky, in turn, said that this does not correspond to the Russian position. According to the statements of Mykhailo Podoliak and David Arakhamia after the negotiations, Ukraine proposed to freeze the issue of the status of Crimea for 15 years, proposed the conclusion of an international treaty on security guarantees, which would be signed and ratified by all countries acting as guarantors of Ukraine's security. But the negotiation process was suspended in May 2022.

On 9 August 2022, explosions occurred at the Saky military airfield in Crimea. As a result of a fire and explosions at the airfield used as the main air force base of the Russian Black Sea Fleet, from 7 to 11 Su-24 and Su-30SM aircraft were destroyed. On 7 September 2022, the Commander-in-Chief of the Armed Forces of Ukraine Valerii Zaluzhnyi announced that it had launched a missile attack on the airfield.

On 23 August 2022, due to the full-scale invasion of Ukraine by the Russian Federation, the second summit of the Crimea Platform was held online. The event was attended by more than 60 participants – leaders of countries and international organizations. They made statements in support of Ukraine.

On 29 August 2022, President of Ukraine Volodymyr Zelenskyy said that the Russian-Ukrainian war would end exactly where it began in 2014 – with the entry of Ukrainian troops to the state border in 1991, the liberation of the previously occupied territories of Ukraine, including Donbas and Crimea from the Russians.

On 28 September 2022, the commander of the US Army in Europe, retired Lieutenant General Ben Hodges, is convinced that the Armed Forces of Ukraine will be able to push the Russian military back to their positions on 23 February by the end of this year, and by mid-2023 the Defense Forces can enter the temporarily occupied Autonomous Republic of Crimea. On 30 September 2022, the head of the Main Directorate of Intelligence of the Ministry of Defense, Kyrylo Budanov, stated that "Ukraine will return to the occupied Crimea – this will happen with weapons and pretty soon. The liberation of Crimea will not take place in the summer, but before the end of spring, perhaps a little earlier."

On 6 October 2022, the administration of President of the United States Joe Biden assessed the likelihood of the liberation of Crimea by the Ukrainian military, noting that de-occupation for Ukraine is already quite possible. That is why such a scenario of events can no longer be discounted. The official emphasized that the pace of advancement of the Ukrainian military in the Kherson Oblast gives hope for the liberation of the peninsula temporarily occupied by Russia.

On 8 October, a fire broke out on the Crimean Bridge in Kerch, the occupation authorities of the peninsula accused Ukraine of undermining the crossing. The Ukrainian government's official Twitter account tweeted "sick burn" in response to the fire, while Mykhailo Podoliak, a Ukrainian presidential advisor, called the damage a "beginning". The Ministry of Defense of Ukraine compared the destruction of the Crimean Bridge to the destruction of the cruiser Moskva: "What's next, Russkies?". The Russian authorities in the Crimea accused the Ukrainian side for what happened.

Mikhail Razvozhayev, the head of annexed Sevastopol, said that on the morning of 29 October 2022, the Ukrainian military attacked ships of the Black Sea Fleet of the Russian Federation and civilian vessels. According to him, it was the most massive drone attack in the entire history of the war, and the ships are damaged. The Russian Ministry of Defense accused the Royal Navy of preparing an attack on Sevastopol, which is allegedly located in Ochakiv of Mykolaiv Oblast. Both Ukraine and Britain have rejected Russian allegations, with the United Kingdom saying Russia is "peddling false claims of an epic scale." On the same day, Russia announced that it was suspending participation in the implementation of the grain agreement allegedly because of the "terrorist attack" in the Sevastopol Bay.

After the return of control by the government of Ukraine to the right-bank Kherson, Mykolaiv Oblasts and the city of Kherson in November 2022, the Financial Times published an article based on the head of the Ukrainian Centre for Security and Cooperation, Serhii Kuzan, in which it was noted that the return of the city of Kherson would allow the Armed Forces of Ukraine to keep under fire control three important roads, in particular to Crimea, from where the Russians supply equipment and ammunition. A little earlier, in November 2022, a lawyer and former military man who served in the Balkans, Iraq and Afghanistan, Frank Ledwidge, told The Guardian that in September, Ukraine's commander- in-chief, General Valeriy Zaluzhnyi, said that he saw Russia's "centre of gravity" – the key to the war – as Crimea. All military indicators strongly suggest that Ukraine's next offensives will set the peninsula as their objective.

On 3 December 2022, it became known that the Russians brought packaging material to the central museums of occupied Crimea and began preparing collections and exhibits for export to the Russian Federation.

On 19 January 2023, during the Ukrainian breakfast in Davos, Volodymyr Zelenskyy stated that the goal of Ukraine is to de-occupy all territories temporarily seized by Russia and called on the Western world to provide heavy weapons for this.

Analytics 
Ukrainian historians and politicians assumed a similar development of events back in 2008 during the Russo-Georgian War. Experts pointed out that the Russian Federation only needed a pretext to start annexing the peninsula. The events at the Euromaidan and the Revolution of Dignity became such an occasion.

On 2 March 2014, in an address to the UN Security Council, Ukrainian Ambassador Yuri Sergeyev called on the international community to "do everything possible" to stop the Russian act of aggression. He stressed that the number of Russian troops in Crimea is growing "by the hour." Russian Ambassador Vitaly Churkin said "colder heads must prevail" and the West must stop escalating the conflict by encouraging the protesters. US Ambassador Samantha Power told the session that Russia allowing the use of force is "dangerous and destabilizing."

On 2 March 2014, The Wall Street Journal indicated that Putin's actions had brought the threat of war to the heart of Europe for the first time since the Cold War.

On 15 April 2014, British diplomat Charles Crawford wrote that he believed that Ukraine was Putin's testbed in his plans to revive the Russian Empire. The annexation of Crimea took place immediately, but the further conquest of Ukraine will be carried out by the method of a thousand cuts.

Deputy Minister of Foreign Affairs of Ukraine Danylo Liubkivskyi:In November 2014, Andrey Illarionov, a former adviser to President of Russia Vladimir Putin, claimed that planning for a Russian invasion began long before Yanukovych's appeal.

In January 2017, Ilya Ponomarev, a Russian politician and member of the State Duma of Russia (Fair Russia faction), claimed that the leadership of the annexation of Crimea was entrusted to Defense Minister Sergei Shoigu and Vladimir Putin's aide Vladislav Surkov.

On 17 December 2019, the Ministry of Foreign Affairs of Ukraine recalled that Russia's actions in Crimea and Donbas fully fall under the definition of aggression in accordance with UN General Assembly Resolution 1976:

On 11 December 2022, The Washington Post published an article reporting that the Western world, while supporting Ukraine, fears that any Ukrainian counteroffensive in Crimea could prompt Vladimir Putin to take decisive action, potentially even using nuclear weapons. Some Western officials hope that an agreement on Ukraine's renunciation of Crimea in favor of Russia can become the basis for a diplomatic end to the war. Rory Finnin, an associate professor at the Department of Ukrainian Studies at the University of Cambridge, believes that a compromise regarding Crimea is unlikely:

Control of settlements

See also 

 Russian-occupied territories of Ukraine
 Russian occupation of Chernihiv Oblast
 Russian occupation of Donetsk Oblast
 Russian occupation of Kharkiv Oblast
 Russian occupation of Kherson Oblast
 Russian occupation of Kyiv Oblast
 Russian occupation of Luhansk Oblast
 Russian occupation of Mykolaiv Oblast
 Russian occupation of Sumy Oblast
 Russian occupation of Zaporizhzhia Oblast
 Russian occupation of Zhytomyr Oblast
 Snake Island during the 2022 Russian invasion of Ukraine
 Russian annexation of Donetsk, Kherson, Luhansk and Zaporizhzhia oblasts
 Day of Resistance to Occupation of Crimea and Sevastopol

Notes

References

A
Southern Ukraine campaign
February 2014 events in Ukraine
March 2014 events in Ukraine
April 2014 events in Ukraine
2015 in Ukraine
2016 in Ukraine
2017 in Ukraine
2018 in Ukraine
2019 in Ukraine
2020 in Ukraine
2021 in Ukraine
February 2022 events in Ukraine
March 2022 events in Ukraine
History of Sevastopol